100 Biscayne, formerly known as New World Tower and 100 Biscayne Tower, is a thirty-story skyscraper in the Central Business District of Greater Downtown Miami, Florida, United States.
100 Biscayne also owns an adjacent 12-story mechanical parking garage that provides parking for its office tenants and its guests but also offers valet parking services for several nearby hotels and restaurants.

Floors two to four of the building house a data center, miami-connect, and the remaining 25 floors contain office space. Formerly, the upper nine floors contained luxury apartments.

When completed in 1965, the building was acclaimed by its architect as "a very modern but conservative design which will wear exceptionally well throughout the years." It was developed by Jose Ferré, the father of former city mayor, Maurice Ferre. It is owned and managed by affiliates of East End Capital Partners, LLC.

See also
List of tallest buildings in Miami

References

External links
Emporis - New World Tower
Property Website

Skyscraper office buildings in Miami
International style architecture in Florida
Office buildings completed in 1965
1965 establishments in Florida